Philip Noon House, also known as YMCA Building of Ebensburg, Phillip Collins House, and the Noon-Collins Inn, is a historic home located at Ebensburg, Cambria County, Pennsylvania.  It was built in 1834 with later additions, and is a stone house in the Federal style.  It was converted for use by the Y.M.C.A. in 1906, at which time a gymnasium was added.  The building also housed the Ebensburg Free Public Library from 1923 to 1949 and the Cambria County Historical Society from 1951 to 1964. The Y.M.C.A. ceased use of the building in 1977.  It is now operated as a bed and breakfast known as the Noon-Collins Inn.

It was added to the National Register of Historic Places in 1984.

References

Bed and breakfasts in Pennsylvania
Houses on the National Register of Historic Places in Pennsylvania
Federal architecture in Pennsylvania
Houses completed in 1834
Houses in Cambria County, Pennsylvania
National Register of Historic Places in Cambria County, Pennsylvania